Cartier is a surname. Notable people with the surname include:

 Albert Cartier (born 1960), French footballer
 Antoine Ephrem Cartier (1836–1910), American businessman
 Edd Cartier (1914–2008), American magazine illustrator
 Emile de Cartier de Marchienne (1871–1946), Belgian diplomat
 Emmanuel Cartier, French criminal
 George Cartier (1869–1944), American football player
 George-Étienne Cartier (1814–1873), Canadian statesman and Father of Confederation
 Henri Cartier-Bresson (1908–2004), French photographer
 Jacques Cartier (1491–1557), French explorer
 Jacques Cartier (businessman) (1750–1814), Canadian entrepreneur and politician
 John Cartier (1733–1802), British colonial governor
 Patricia Cartier, French criminal
 Pierre Cartier (mathematician) (born 1932), French mathematician
 Rudolph Cartier (1904–1994), Austrian television director
 Walter Cartier (1922–1995), American boxer turned actor
 Warren Antoine Cartier (1866–1936), American businessman

Cartier brothers
Involved with Cartier (jeweler)
 Jacques Cartier (jeweler) (1884–1941), French jeweller
 Louis Cartier, French jeweller
 Pierre C. Cartier (1878–1964), French jeweller

French-language surnames